Mike Radja (born March 7, 1985) is an American professional ice hockey forward who is currently a free agent. Radja previously played for Anyang Halla of the Asia League Ice Hockey. In Europe, he played for HC TPS in the Liiga, Augsburger Panther in the Deutsche Eishockey Liga and the Belfast Giants in the Elite Ice Hockey League.

Playing career
Radja was raised in Yorkville, Illinois and graduated from Yorkville High School in 2003. Radja played two seasons of junior hockey for the Waterloo Black Hawks of the USHL. While at Waterloo Radja played with his future University of New Hampshire teammate Kevin Regan. Radja scored a key goal in the game which clinched the Black Hawks' victory in the 2004 Clark Cup.

He attended  the University of New Hampshire from 2004 to 2008. In December 2006 he suffered a knee injury which caused him to miss a month of play. He made a quick recovery, however. In 2008 he was suspended for two games after an incident in which he was briefly detained by police while visiting T. J. Oshie after a game against North Dakota. That season proved to be a successful one for Radja, he was selected for the Hockey East All Star team and was the National College Hockey Player of the month in February 2008.

After leaving UNH, he briefly played for the Syracuse Crunch of the AHL at the end of 2007–08 season. The next year he played in eight games with the Fresno Falcons of the ECHL before spending most of the season with the Rockford IceHogs of the AHL. In the 2009–10 season Radja played in twenty five games in Finland with TPS of the SM-liiga before returning to North America to play for the Syracuse Crunch and Bridgeport Sound Tigers in the AHL. The next year Radja returned to Europe to play for the Augsburger Panther of the Deutsche Eishockey Liga. On January 13, 2012 Radja signed with the Houston Aeros of the American Hockey League.

After four seasons abroad, Radja opted to continue his professional career back in North America, signing a one-year ECHL contract in a return with the Elmira Jackals on August 4, 2016.

Career statistics

Awards and honors

References

External links

1985 births
American men's ice hockey forwards
HL Anyang players
Augsburger Panther players
Belfast Giants players
Binghamton Senators players
Bridgeport Sound Tigers players
Elmira Jackals (ECHL) players
Fresno Falcons players
High1 players
Houston Aeros (1994–2013) players
Ice hockey players from Illinois
Living people
New Hampshire Wildcats men's ice hockey players
Nippon Paper Cranes players
People from Yorkville, Illinois
Peoria Rivermen (AHL) players
Rockford IceHogs (AHL) players
Syracuse Crunch players
HC TPS players
University of New Hampshire alumni
Waterloo Black Hawks players
AHCA Division I men's ice hockey All-Americans
American expatriate ice hockey players in Finland
American expatriate ice hockey players in Germany
American expatriate ice hockey players in Japan
American expatriate ice hockey players in South Korea
American expatriate ice hockey players in Northern Ireland